Analmaye  was a Kushite King of Meroe who ruled in the 6th century BC.

He succeeded King Malonaqen and was in turn succeeded by King Amaninatakilebte.

He was buried in Nuri.

References

6th-century BC monarchs of Kush